Airieland is a farm in the historical county of Kirkcudbrightshire, in the Scottish council area of Dumfries and Galloway. It is found 3 miles (5 km) south of Castle Douglas.

References

Geography of Dumfries and Galloway